Amirbai Karnataki (c. 1906 – 3 March 1965) was a famous actress/singer and playback singer of the early Hindi cinema and was famous as Kannada Kokila. Mahatma Gandhi was an ardent fan of her song Vaishnav Jan To.

Early life
Amirbai Karnataki was born in Bilgi town, District of Bagalkote in Karnataka into a middle-class family. Of all of her five sisters, Amirbai and her elder sister, Gauharbai, earned fame and fortune. Amirbai completed her matriculation and went to Bombay at the age of fifteen.

Career
Amirbai was a talented singer and actress, who was fluent in Kannada (mother tongue) and Gujarati languages. "Mahre te gamray ek baar aawjo" is one of her famous Gujarati songs from the film Ranrakdevi, with music composer Avinash Vyas. A representative from HMV Label music company was so impressed by her singing talent that he made her sing a Qawwali, which became very popular. This qawwali song was for the film Zeenat (1945) by film producer-director Shaukat Hussain Rizvi. Her elder sister, Gauherbai, was an actress and helped Amirbai get a role in the film Vishnu Bhakti in 1934.

Initially, Amirbai sang songs in films, but they failed to attain the success she desired. In 1943, with the release of Bombay Talkies' Kismet (1943 film), she achieved popularity: the songs of Kismet became a rage and Amirbai became famous. The man behind the success was the composer Anil Biswas. She was initially known as a singing star, but at the decline of her career, she became a playback singer. She reached her career peak by 1947.

After 1947, Lata Mangeshkar became a rising star, so once again Amirbai switched over to acting. In her later years, she mostly played character roles. Amirbai also composed music for Wahab Pictures' film Shehnaaz (1948). In the same year she almost left Hindi Cinema for Gujarati and Marwari films. One of the famous film magazines "Film India" had mentioned in one of its articles that at that time in the 20th century when other singers used to get Rs. 500 for singing a song, Amirbai used to get Rs. 1000 per recording.

Personal life
Amirbai's married life was full of ups and downs. Her first marriage was with the film actor Himalay Vala (aka Afzal Qureshi). He was a well-known actor for playing villainous roles in the movies. He used to beat Amirbai frequently after marriage, and spent most of her earnings for his personal leisure. Amirbai had to put a fake smile on her face while performing as an actress and even while singing in studios. Famous Gujarati writer Bhai Ranjan Kumar Pandaya has mentioned Amirbai's married life struggles in detail. He says that Amirbai's elder sister Ahilya Bai, yearning for justice, one late night went to the famous Gujarati lawyer Chelshankar Vyas. She told Vyas that Himalay Vala took a handsome amount and Amirbai's car in return for a divorce. And the very next day, he had even kidnapped her publicly from a recording studio. He had imprisoned her in a room and was repeatedly beating her. Even the police were with Himalay Vala. Chelshankar Vyas, taking into account all these allegations, decided to help her. He used his societal status and judicial understanding and finally got a divorce for Amirbai from her husband. In the year 1947, when India got partitioned between India and Pakistan, Himalayawala went to Pakistan and earned himself a good reputation as a talented actor. Here in India, Amirbai got married for the second time with Badri Kaanchwala, the editor of Paras, who was a better husband.

Selected songs
"O' Jaanay Waalay Balamwa Laut Kay Aa Laut Kay Aa" Sung by Amirbai Karnataki and Shyam Kumar, lyrics by D. N. Madhok and music by Naushad Ali in the film Rattan (1944) 
"Dheere Dheere Aa Re, Baadal", from the film Kismat (1943) 
"Priya madhuvanadali", a Kannada song, sung by Amirbai, which is so popular all over Karnataka even today.

Death
She had a paralytic attack in 1965, died just four days later, and was buried in her hometown. A cinema hall is still run in the name of "Amir Talkies" in the city of Vijayapura (Bijapur), by her family.

Biography 
 Amirbai Karnataki written in Kannada by Rahamat Tarikere

References

External links
Amirbai Karnataki filmography on Complete Index To World Film (C.I.T.W.F.) website
 , Filmography of Amirbai Karnataki

1900s births
1965 deaths
Bollywood playback singers
Actresses in Hindi cinema
20th-century Indian actresses
Indian women playback singers
Singers from Karnataka
People from Bijapur district, Karnataka
20th-century Indian singers
Film musicians from Karnataka
Actresses from Karnataka
20th-century Indian women singers
Women musicians from Karnataka
Kannada playback singers